Ascalenia decolorella is a moth in the family Cosmopterigidae. It is found in southern Russia.

References

Moths described in 1984
Ascalenia
Moths of Europe